In the U.S. telephone network, the 12-channel carrier system was an early frequency-division multiplexing system standard, used to carry multiple telephone calls on a single twisted pair of wires, mostly for short to medium distances. In this system twelve voice channels are multiplexed in a high frequency carrier and passed through a balanced pair trunk line similar to those used for individual voice frequency connections. The original system is obsolete today, but the multiplexing of voice channels in units of 12 or 24 channels in modern digital trunk lines such as T-1 is a legacy of the system.

History
The twelve channel scheme was first devised in the early 1930s to provide a line spectrum covering 60 to 108 kHz for the Type J Carrier Telephone System, an equivalent four wire (on two wire facilities) open wire carrier that was used almost exclusively for interstate long haul toll telephony. This became the basic building block, the "channel group", for all succeeding long haul systems, such as Type K and all the Type L systems into the late 1970s. All long haul "channel groups" used the single-sideband/suppressed carrier heterodyne scheme that was produced by a Western Electric Type A-1 through A-6 channel bank.

The twelve channel scheme, in order to maintain some bandwidth and routing compatibility, was carried through to the short haul carriers, as well, as they started developing to eliminate voice band open wire trunk lines in the 1950s. The Bell System vacuum-tube driven N-1 Carrier of the early 1950s was the most used twelve channel carrier system, using double sideband/unsuppressed carrier operation which didn't need network timebase synchronization to maintain frequency accuracy. N-2 was similar in heterodyning scheme, but in discrete transistorized "plug-in unit" architecture, while N3 used the same frequency plan but a scheme of using single sideband with a different voice channel on each side of the carrier, a technique first seen on the 16 channel Type "O" open wire short haul carrier of the 1950s. This doubled the capacity to 24 channels, the same as a basic digital Type T PCM carrier introduced in the late 1950s, which became the now-ubiquitous "T-1" of the digital world.

Repeaters were spaced approximately 6 miles (10 km) apart, depending on wire gauge. With few exceptions, N-carriers used 19 gage unloaded toll pairs in two-wire operation. Each repeater either received from both directions at a low frequency band and sent in both directions at a higher band, or vice versa. This frequency frogging allowed equivalent four-wire operation on a single cable pair in two-wire operation.

During the period when Type N-1 was in widespread use, Lenkurt Corporation, owned and controlled by General Telephone, fielded a variant competitor, the Type BN. BN used the same pairs and repeaters as did the Bell N-CXR, but used four channel "groups," lower single-sideband heterodyning, and 24 channels per carrier, as later seen on Western Electric's Type N-3. Type BN was used at times by Bell Operating Companies after the 1956 Hush-a-phone Decision of the US Supreme Court, a landmark case which challenged AT&T's "benign monopoly" of US telephone equipment industry. Part of this settlement was for AT&T's Bell Operating Companies to buy and use small amounts of Lenkurt and Collins microwave and carrier systems. In California, Type BN was used almost exclusively to provide trunk and private line connections between Pacific Tel. & Tel. toll offices and local General Telephone end offices.

Multiplexing
History of the telephone